Antipinite (IMA symbol: Atp) is a rare alkali Copper oxalate mineral with the chemical formula . Its type locality is the Tarapacá Region in Chile.

References 

Sodium minerals
Potassium minerals
Copper(II) minerals
Oxalate minerals
Minerals described in 2015